Astana Giribangun (also "Giri Bangun"), is a mausoleum complex for the Soeharto family of the former President of Indonesia.
The mausoleum is located in Karang Bangun, Matesih, Karanganyar Regency, Central Java province.  It is on the slopes of Mount Lawu, approximately 35 kilometres east of the city of Surakarta. The archaic Javanese prose title translates as "Palace of the risen mountain".

The structure is in traditional Javanese architectural style and occupies parts of the Mangkunegaran Royal Cemetery complex.  It is approximately 300 metres from the burial sites of the Solonese royals Mangkunegara I, II and III. Former President Soeharto was buried in Astana Giribangun on 29 January 2008 with full state military honours following his death in Jakarta the day before. President Susilo Bambang Yudhoyono presided over the ceremony. Suharto was buried beside his late wife, Mrs (Ibu) Tien Soeharto (Siti Hartinah Soeharto, who had died on April 28, 1996) and her mother.

Later, in October 2010, in line with traditional Javanese practice, Soeharto's family held a memorial ceremony at the Astana Giribangun 1,000 days after his death.

The choice of the site caused some controversy at the time.  Many Javanese believed Ibu Soeharto not to be of true noble blood but, rather, a commoner who was the descendant of a faithful court servant. The Mangkunegaran Court reconciled this controversy by decreeing that Soeharto could indeed build an Astana (istana in bahasa Indonesia, or palace) but that it could not be any higher than a pre-existing royal tomb, the Astana Mangadeg, near where the Astana Giribangun was to be established. The Astana Mangadeg was considered to be in a location having special spiritual features by many of the dukuns, spiritualists and soothsayers who had supported Soeharto's kejawen (or kebatinan) practices of meditating and drawing charisma from shakti (magic).<ref>Astana Giribangun. Panduan Peziarah. Yayasan Mangadeg Surakarta, 1996. See also Dwi Atmana, 'Mysticism shrouded Soeharto's life, death', The Jakarta Post, 29 January 2008.</ref>

References

Further readingAstana Giribangun. Panduan Peziarah. Yayasan Mangadeg Surakarta. 1996.(Indonesian language) ISBN unknown.
 Indonesia, Justine Varsulis. Lonely Planet, 2007: 206. Dewi Sri in Village Garb: Fertility, Myth, and Ritual in Northeast Java, Journal article by Rens Heringa; in Asian Folklore Studies Vol. 56. Asian Folklore Studies 1997.Self and Self-Conduct among the Javanese "priyayi" Elite'', translated from Indonesian by J. Joseph Errington. American Ethnologist, Vol. 11, No. 2 (May, 1984), pp.

External links
 

Buildings and structures in Central Java
Suharto
Muslim cemeteries
Sunni cemeteries
Mausoleums in Indonesia
Burials in Java
Cemeteries in Java
Mount Lawu